The Garfield television specials are a series of twelve half-hour long American animated television specials based on the Garfield comic strip of the same name created by Jim Davis. All twelve specials were directed by Phil Roman, written by Davis, and featuring the voice of Lorenzo Music as the character. The specials were originally broadcast on CBS from 1982 to 1991. Although the first two specials were produced by Lee Mendelson Films, this boutique studio was fully committed to the production of the Peanuts animated specials and could not allocate resources for the Garfield specials. All of the remaining Garfield specials were produced by Roman's own production company and namesake Film Roman.

List

Reception 
All the Garfield animated specials received Primetime Emmy Award nominations for Outstanding Animated Program, winning four including Garfield on the Town, Garfield in the Rough, Garfield's Halloween Adventure, and Garfield's Babes and Bullets.

See also 
 Happy Birthday, Garfield

References 

1982 American television series debuts
1991 American television series endings
 
Film Roman television specials
Television shows directed by Phil Roman
CBS television specials
1980s American television specials
1990s American television specials
Television shows written by Jim Davis (cartoonist)